Edoardo Bosio (9 November 1864 – 31 July 1927) was an Italian footballing innovator from Turin who played as a forward. He is a prime figure in the history of Italian football as evidence exists to show that he founded the earliest football club in the country; Torino Football and Cricket Club. He was also a clever rower of the Armida Rowing Club in Turin.

Biography
As a young man, Bosio was a merchant worker in the British "Thomas Adams" textile industry, as part of his work he had the opportunity to live in Nottingham, England for a while and experienced the game of football. Upon returning to his native Turin in 1886 he was determined to spread the word of football in his homeland; he brought back a leather ball and founded Torino Football and Cricket Club that year.

Bosio remained involved with the club after they merged with Nobili Torino to form Internazionale Torino. This is the club with whom he competed in the earliest Italian Football Championships, picking up two runners-up medals with the club. He even lured the famous Herbert Kilpin into Italian football, when he was hired to work for Bosio in the textiles industry.

In 1900 Bosio remained with the club as they merged into FBC Torinese, picking up another runners-up spot and notably scoring a hat-trick against Milan in the semi-finals of the Italian Football Championship which made him the topscorer of the tournament.

Honours
Internazionale Torino
Italian Football Championship runners-up: 1898, 1899

Torinese
Italian Football Championship runners-up: 1900

Individual
Capocannoniere: 1898

Filmography
1914 - La Vita Negli Abissi Del Mare

References

Further reading
 
 Carla F. Gütermann, Giulia Boringhieri, Birrifici a Torino: dai Bosio ai Boringhieri, in «Arte&Storia», Svizzeri a Torino: nella storia nell’arte nella cultura nell’economia dal Quattrocento ad oggi, Edizioni Ticino Management, anno 11, numero 52, ottobre 2011. Lugano 2011, pp. 522–529.

External links

Italian footballers
1864 births
1927 deaths
Footballers from Turin
Founders of association football institutions
Association football forwards